Bandt is a surname. It most commonly refers to Adam Bandt (born 1972), an Australian politician and the incumbent leader of the Australian Greens.

Other notable people with the surname include:

 Jean-Pierre De Bandt (born 1934), Belgian lawyer and former President of the Coudenberg group
 Lewis Bandt (1910–1987), Australian car designer
 Ros Bandt (born 1951), Australian composer, sound artist, academic, and performer